Yuliana Bulatovna Salakhova (Russian: Юлиана Булатовна Салахова; born 16 December 1984) is a Russian former sprint canoeist. She won two medals at the 2010 ICF Canoe Sprint World Championships in Poznań with a silver in the K-2 500 m and a bronze in the K-2 1000 m events.

At the 2008 Summer Olympics in Beijing, Salakhova finished ninth in the K-1 500 m event.  In the same event at the 2012 Summer Olympics, she finished nineteenth. She was also part of the Russian K-4 500 m team that finished in seventh.

References

1984 births
Canoeists at the 2008 Summer Olympics
Canoeists at the 2012 Summer Olympics
Living people
Olympic canoeists of Russia
Russian female canoeists
ICF Canoe Sprint World Championships medalists in kayak
Sportspeople from Volgograd
European Games competitors for Russia
Canoeists at the 2015 European Games
21st-century Russian women